Waltograph is the name of a freeware typeface based on the lettering of the Walt Disney logotype.

Description

Several versions exist, some under its original title of "Walt Disney Script". The typeface is not, as many assume, based on the actual handwriting of Walt Disney; rather, it is an extrapolation of the Walt Disney Company's corporate logotype, which was based on a stylized version of Walt Disney's autograph. First released in 2000, Walt Disney Script was continuously updated and eventually renamed Waltograph in 2004.

Reception
Although the project is unofficial and not affiliated with nor endorsed by the Walt Disney Company, it has been used by the company on occasions.

One writer remarked that "When Mickey Mouse sits down to tap out his memoirs, we bet the title page will be set in Waltograph." Like the informal font Comic Sans, Waltograph gets rave reviews from many, but not all audiences.

References

External links 
 Waltograph at mickeyavenue.com

Casual script typefaces
Typefaces and fonts introduced in 2000
The Walt Disney Company